Southern Rhodesia competed as Rhodesia at the 1964 Summer Olympics in Tokyo, Japan. 29 competitors, 25 men and 4 women, took part in 15 events in 7 sports. It was the last of three appearances at the Summer Olympics by a Rhodesian representation;  Zimbabwe would make its first appearance at the 1980 Summer Olympics.

Athletics

Boxing

Diving

Field hockey

Men's Roster
John McPhun

Sailing

Shooting

Two shooters represented Rhodesia in 1964.

Trap
 Johannes Lamprecht
 Jack Rickards

Swimming

References

External links
Official Olympic Reports

Nations at the 1964 Summer Olympics
1964
1964 in Southern Rhodesia
1964